Biofabrication is a peer-reviewed scientific journal covering research that leads to the fabrication of advanced biological models, medical therapeutic products, and non-medical biological systems. The editor-in-chief is Wei Sun (Drexel University).

Abstracting and indexing
The journal is abstracted and indexed in:

According to the Journal Citation Reports, the journal has a 2020 impact factor of 9.954.

References

External links
 

IOP Publishing academic journals
Materials science journals
Publications established in 2009
Quarterly journals
English-language journals